The Ben and Margaret Stone Boathouse is a historic boathouse in the Town of Plum Lake in Vilas County, Wisconsin. The boathouse was built in 1928 by Ben and Margaret Stone of Tripoli, Wisconsin. It was built in the American Craftsman style and is one of the few two-story boathouses on Plum Lake. The boathouse was listed on the National Register of Historic Places on February 7, 2008.

References

American Craftsman architecture in Wisconsin
Boathouses in the United States
Buildings and structures completed in 1928
Buildings and structures in Vilas County, Wisconsin
National Register of Historic Places in Vilas County, Wisconsin
Boathouses on the National Register of Historic Places in Wisconsin